Destuntzia rubra is a species of truffle-like fungus in the family Gomphaceae, and the type species of the genus Destuntzia. The fungus was first described scientifically in 1899 by H. W. Harkness as Hymenogaster ruber. Robert Fogel and James Trappe transferred it to Destuntzia in 1985.

References

External links

Gomphaceae
Fungi of North America
Fungi described in 1899